"Ik zou je het liefste in een doosje willen doen" (I'd like to put you in a box) is a 1959 Dutch song written by Annie M.G. Schmidt (lyrics) and  (music) for the 1950s television show . The song describes a man who loves his partner so much that he would like to keep her in a little box.  Sung by Donald Jones, it was a hit and helped propel Jones to stardom. The song remains a standard in Dutch cabaret and musical comedy.

The song is one of Annie M.G. Schmidt's most popular tunes, and provided the title for a theater show about Schmidt (who died in 1995) that celebrates her 100th anniversary and contain 26 of her most beloved songs. Ostensibly, the title is based on a phrase that Schmidt's mother used to say to her daughter.

References

Dutch pop songs
Dutch-language songs
1959 songs
Songs with lyrics by Annie M. G. Schmidt